Tiago André may refer to:
Tiago André (footballer, born 1983), Portuguese footballer who plays as a forward
Tiago André (footballer, born 1997), Portuguese footballer who plays as a left-back